United States gubernatorial elections were held on November 7, 1995, in three states. Prior to the elections, Democrats held two seats and Republicans one. With the Republican gain of the open seat in Louisiana, Republicans held two seats and Democrats one following the elections.

Summary

Closest races 
States where the margin of victory was under 5%:
 Kentucky, 2.2%

See also 
1995 United States elections
1995 United States House of Representatives elections